The Royal Thai Army Aviation Center ( is the administrative organization in the Royal Thai Army responsible for
 Conduct research and develop to define doctrines and make textbooks in science.
 Configuration of all army aviation units.
 General support flight operations per military unit, both administrative missions and send maintenance and other missions as assigned.
 Military operations.
 Produce, training, and control personnel who aircraft mechanics, crewmen, pirots, and workers about army aviation.
 Provide advice and technical advice on Army Aviation affairs to relevant units and branches of technology.
 Recommend, suggest, supervise the Royal Thai Army's aviation safety aviation affairs.
 Search and rescue assistance for disaster victims to support government agencies and other organizations in disaster relief.
 Study, research, and develop as well as collect statistics about Army Aviation Affairs.

It is based at Fort Princess Srinagarindra, in Mueang Lopburi District.

History
Thai military aviation began in 1911 when three Siamese army officers were sent to France to learn to pilot aircraft. They returned to Siam in 1913 with four Nieuport monoplanes and four Breguet biplanes. An aerodrome constructed at Don Mueang and the army aviation units moved there on 17 March 1914. On 27 March 1914 the unit became the Army Air Corps. Since then, 27 March has been observed as the birthday of the Royal Thai Air Force.

In 1918, the Army Air Corps gained the status of a division consisting of three wings. It remained under the army until December 1921 when it was renamed the Air Division and was placed directly under the Ministry of War. The Air Division's name changed again in 1935 to the Air Force Division. In 1937 it was proclaimed the Royal Thai Air Force. In 1967 the Army Aviation School was founded, and the Army Aviation Center was created on 20 September 1977.

Mission
 Planning, directing, and practicing And study about Operation of the Royal Thai Army.
 Conduct research Develop, define principles and make texts in science associated.
 Ruling the military units that the Ministry of Defense requires The commander of the Army Aviation Center is responsible for.

Organization
 Royal Thai Army Aviation Center Headquarters
 Royal Thai Army Aviation Regiment
 Light Aviation Battlion
 1st Aviation Battlion
 2nd Aviation Battlion
 3rd Aviation Battlion
 9th Aviation Battlion
 21st Aviation Battlion
 41st Aviation Battlion
 Science Division
 Service Division
 Airport Division
 Aviation Communications Division
 Aviation Safety Division
 Disease examination unit
 Army Aviation School
 Department of Aviation
 Aviation Base Defense Battalion
 Aviation Communication Support Division

Aircraft
The Royal Thai Army is known to operate the following aircraft types:

References

Royal Thai Army
Military units and formations of Thailand
Military units and formations established in 1935